Early in the Morning may refer to:

"Early in the Morning" (Sonny Boy Williamson I song), a 1937 single by Sonny Boy Williamson I
"Early in the Mornin'" (Louis Jordan song), a 1947 single by Louis Jordan and His Tympany Five
"Early in the Morning" (Bobby Darin song), a 1958 single by Bobby Darin, also recorded by Buddy Holly on Coral Records
"Early in the Morning", a song by Peter, Paul and Mary from their album Peter, Paul and Mary
"Early in the Morning" (Vanity Fare song), a 1969 single by Vanity Fare
"Early in the Morning", a song (listed as traditional), on the 1965 album The Sound of '65 by The Graham Bond Organisation and on the 1970 album Ginger Baker's Air Force
"Early in the Morning", a 1979 song on the album Desolation Angels (album) by Bad Company.
"Early in the Morning" (Gap Band song), a 1982 single by The Gap Band. Remake: Early in the Morning Robert Palmer 1985                            
"Early in the Morning" (Larry Santos song), a song by Larry Santos
Early in the Morning (James Vincent McMorrow album), 2010
Early in the Morning (Lorez Alexandria album), 1960
"Early Morning", a song by Sonu Nigam, and remixed by Ali Zafar along with rap of "Limitless", for the 2013 Bollywood film Chashme Baddoor (2013 film)